Henrietta Latham Dwight  (October 21, 1840 – February 6, 1909) was an American artist, animal welfare advocate and vegetarian.

Biography

Dwight was born in Philadelphia as Henrietta Marshall. Her parents were Charles Manchester Marshall of England and Henrietta Cole of Kentucky.

In 1860 she married James Hoge Latham, they had three children. In 1876 her husband died and she married Colonel James F. Dwight in 1880. She moved into a fifty-room mansion, Thrulow Lodge, in Menlo Park. She was known for her watercolor landscapes. Dwight studied with Christian Jorgensen and her artwork focused on Californian coastal life.

Dwight authored an early vegetarian cookbook, The Golden Age Cook-Book, in 1898. The cookbook was lacto-ovo vegetarian and utilized "mock meat" recipes, such as mock chicken croquettes and mock fish soup. Her mock chicken recipe was made from breadcrums, eggs, lemon juice and walnuts. Dwight stated that meat eating was "not necessary to the perfect health of man".

Death

She died in Paris and was buried in Mountain View Cemetery, California. In 1918, in memory of Dwight and her first husband, their children Edith and Milton Latham formed the Latham Foundation with the aim of promoting humane education and respect for all living creatures.

Selected publications

The Golden Age Cook-Book (1898)

References

1840 births
1909 deaths
19th-century American women artists
American cookbook writers
American animal welfare workers
American vegetarianism activists
Vegetarian cookbook writers
Women cookbook writers
Writers from Philadelphia